Russell Ennis (born Russell Edward Ennis) (March 10, 1897 – January 21, 1949) was a Major League Baseball catcher. He was a member of the Washington Senators in 1926.

References

Sportspeople from Superior, Wisconsin
Baseball players from Wisconsin
Washington Senators (1901–1960) players
Major League Baseball catchers
1897 births
1949 deaths
Coffeyville Refiners players
Minor league baseball managers